Petlad is a Town and a municipality "Taluka" in Anand district in the Gujarat state of India. Petlad was founded and ruled by Koli Chieftain Patal Khant .

Education
R. K. Parikh Arts & Science College
New Education High School(NEHS)
N.K High School
The Western English Medium School (TWEMS)
R. K. High School
Surya International School
St. Mary's High School
Convent of Jesus and Mary School

References 

Cities and towns in Anand district